The 2016–17 season was Middlesbrough's fifteenth season in the Premier League, their first since relegation in the 2008–2009 season, after gaining promotion the previous season in their 141st year in existence. Along with the Premier League, the club also competed in the FA Cup and EFL Cup. The season covered the period from 1 July 2016 to 30 June 2017.

Middlesbrough's long-awaited return to the top flight proved to be disastrous, as the team struggled to score goals all season, despite boasting a strong defensive record compared to other teams in the bottom half of the table. Their total of 27 goals scored throughout the season was the lowest in the Premier League, leading to manager Aitor Karanka's dismissal in March. Caretaker manager Steve Agnew could not improve the team's fortunes as they were mathematically relegated back to the Championship on 8 May 2017 following their 3–0 away defeat to Chelsea, who would go on to become champions.

Squad

First team squad

 L = Player on Loan

Transfers

Transfers in

Total spending  £20,800,000

Loans in

Loans out

Transfers out

New contracts

Competitions

Overview

{| class="wikitable" style="text-align: center"
|-
!rowspan=2|Competition
!colspan=8|Record
|-
!
!
!
!
!
!
!
!
|-
| Premier League

|-
| FA Cup

|-
| League Cup

|-
! Total

Pre-season friendlies

Premier League

Matches

Results by matchday

Results summary

League table

FA Cup

EFL Cup

Statistics

Appearances

Top scorers
The list is sorted by shirt number when total goals are equal.

Clean sheets
The list is sorted by shirt number when total appearances are equal.

References

Middlesbrough F.C. seasons
Middlesbrough